Catherine Octavia Stevens (1865-1959) was an amateur astronomer who was Director of the British Astronomical Association Meteor Section from 1905 to 1911.

She joined the British Astronomical Association on 27 May 1891. On the 1911 census she gave her occupation as Astronomer, working for the British Astronomical Association. In 1939 her occupation was listed as Meteorologist Astronomer.

Her address on the 1911 census was The Plain, Foxcombe Hill, Oxford., a house with an observatory at the top of Boars Hill, Oxford. She lived there from 1910 to 1956. Her first interest was the Sun and she made drawings of sunspots using a 3 inch refractor.

Travels

Catherine Stevens travelled to see total solar eclipses from Algiers on May 28, 1900, Majorca on August 30, 1905 and Quebec on August 31, 1932.  She spent a year in  Shetland to study the Aurora Borealis. She travelled to New Zealand and visited the hot springs at Rotorua.

Family
She was born at the Rectory, Bradfield, Berkshire on 23 January 1865, the daughter of Thomas Stevens (1809-1888), Rector of Bradfield and founder of Bradfield College and Susanna Stevens née Marriott (c1824-1866), daughter of Rev Robert Marriott, Rector of Cotesbach, Leicestershire. Catherine Stevens died on 16 June 1959.

Her older sister, Mary Ann Stevens, married John Oldrid Scott, son of the architect George Gilbert Scott.

Publications

Obituary
 Written by James Henry Drake.

References

External links
A drawing of the corona at the total solar eclipse of 30 August 1905, made by Catherine Stevens in Richard McKim, A different sort of society, Astronomy & Geophysics, Volume 57, Issue 4, August 2016, Pages 4.14–4.17,

Women astronomers
20th-century British astronomers
1865 births
People from Bradfield, Berkshire
People from Vale of White Horse (district)
1959 deaths
19th-century British astronomers